Jorge Luis Márquez Gómez also known as Anelka, (born June, 1988) is a Venezuelan footballer  midfielder who plays for Bauger FC in the Liga Dominicana de Fútbol.

Club career
Its beginnings and motivation for soccer born in San Jose Academy and the San Jacinto school there was beginning to form Jorge Anelka Marquez. After its start in these small schools, Jorge comes to the UCV FC where he participated in the under-17 category, then he joined the Aragua FC where he participated in the Under 20 and manages to give the jump to the professional level. His long-awaited debut in the first division reaches his 18 years in the hands of Professor Manolo Contreras with Aragua FC confronting him where Vigia FC got the victory 2 goals to 1 in the Olympic Hermanos Ghersi Páez in Maracay Stadium. In 2007, he was champion of Venezuela Cup in the Aragua FC with only 18 years old. Then passing through the Carabobo FC at the time the club was in the second division of the Venezuelan professional football, Jorge Marquez achieved promotion to the first division with the club. Notably, Jorge Marquez was in the call for Aragua FC for the 2008 Copa Sudamericana in the two matches of the first phase vs Chivas de Guadalajara, phase where the Aragua FC would stay out of the tournament in a global score of 3 -2 for Chivas.

References 

 Jorge Anelka Marquez se incorporo al atlantico fc de la republica dominicana
 el talentoso Jorge Anelka Marquez
 
 zulia sumo cuatro piezas en sus filas
 Anelka anota primer gol de la historia de atlantico fc

External links 
 

1988 births
Living people
Sportspeople from Maracay
Venezuelan footballers
Aragua FC players
Carabobo F.C. players
Zulia F.C. players
Venezuelan expatriate footballers
Expatriate footballers in the Dominican Republic
Association football midfielders
Venezuelan expatriate sportspeople in the Dominican Republic